is a town located in Ibaraki Prefecture, Japan. , the town had an estimated population of 47,927 in 20,279 households and a population density of 671 persons per km². The percentage of the population aged over 65 was 28.3%.

Geography
Located in southern Ibaraki Prefecture, Ami is bordered to the north by Lake Kasumigaura

Surrounding municipalities
Ibaraki Prefecture
 Inashiki
 Tsuchiura
 Ushiku
 Miho

Climate
Ami has a Humid continental climate (Köppen Cfa) characterized by warm summers and cool winters with light snowfall.  The average annual temperature in Ami is 13.8 °C. The average annual rainfall is 1306 mm with September as the wettest month. The temperatures are highest on average in August, at around 25.7 °C, and lowest in January, at around 2.8 °C.

Demographics
Per Japanese census data, the population of Ami  has recently plateaued after a long period of growth.

History
During the Edo period, the area around Ami was part of Hitachi Province. The villages of Ami, Kimihara, Asahi and Funashima were created with the establishment of the modern municipalities system on April 1, 1889. In 1921, the Imperial Japanese Navy established  Kasumigaura Air Field, a naval aviation training base at Ami, with floatplane operations on nearby Kasumigaura. Zeppelin operations also began from 1929. In 1937, the Youth Aviation Squadron was transferred from Yokosuka. The base was repeatedly bombed in 1944 and 1945 during World War II, with the attack on June 10, 1945 killing over 300 people.

On April 1, 1955, the villages of Ami, Kimihara and Asahi merged to form the town of Ami. Most of the village of Funashima joined on April 20, 1955.

Government
Ami has a mayor-council form of government with a directly elected mayor and a unicameral town council of 18 members. Ami contributes one member to the Ibaraki Prefectural Assembly. In terms of national politics, the town is part of Ibaraki 6th district of the lower house of the Diet of Japan.

Economy
Ami has a mixed economy.  Agriculture remains predominant; however, there are also numerous factories for chemicals, light manufacturing and electronics. The Japanese Ground Self-Defense Force also has a number of military installations in the town.

Education
Ibaraki University – Department of Agriculture
Ibaraki Prefectural University of Health Sciences 
Ami has seven public elementary schools and four public middle schools operated by the town government, and one public high school operated by the Ibaraki Prefectural Board of Education.

Transportation

Railway
Ami does not have any passenger rail service.

Highway
  – Ushiku-Ami Interchange, Ami-Higashi Interchange

Military facilities
JGSDF Camp Tutiura
JGSDF Ordnance School
JGSDF Camp Kasumigaura

Local attractions
site of Jojo Castle
Yokaren Peace Memorial Museum
Ami Premium Outlet Shopping Center

International relations
 – Superior, WI, USA – sister city since 1997 
 – Liuzhou, Guangxi Zhuang Autonomous Region, China (friendship city) from June 1997

References

External links

Official Website 

Towns in Ibaraki Prefecture
Ami, Ibaraki